Positivus Festival is an annual, three-day summer music and culture festival that was held in Salacgrīva, Latvia from 2007 to 2019. After two cancelled editions due to the Covid-19 pandemic, the festival moved to the capital Riga from 2022.

First held in 2007, Positivus combines a variety of genres, including indie, pop, folk, electronic and more styles in between. The festival is organized by Positivus Music. The festival always takes place during an extended weekend- from Thursday afternoon until Sunday morning of the third week of July. 
Positivus Festival is the largest music and arts festival in the Baltic States that takes place every year in the middle of July. Every year Positivus Festival is becoming more and more popular in Europe. It is a festival with international chart toppers and underground emerging talent set in an idyllic holiday location. Positivus Festival has been awarded the title "Best European Festival" and is mentioned in many shortlists as one of the top music festivals to visit in Europe.

Positivus festival has a vibe of bohemian, friends and family oriented sort which weighs over the loud party vibe more common at music festivals. Positivus attendance has been around 30000 people for the last few years.

Over the years there have been up to six live stages featuring around 60-70 artists every year on average, most notably including Pixies, Alt-J, Ellie Goulding (multiple years), The Lumineers, Hot Chip, John Newman, Placebo, M83, Air, Iggy Pop, Tom Odell (multiple years), Elbow, Daughter, Kraftwerk, Bastille, The Kooks, Sigur Rós, Imagine Dragons, The XX, Hurts, OK Go, Muse and many others. The festival line-up usually consists of a number of chart topping artists as well as new and exciting performers from all over the world, with Latvian and Estonian artists having a strong presence. The festival takes place only 12 km from the Estonian-Latvian border, therefore there is a strong attendance of Estonian visitors, musicians, caterers and marketers as well as festival personnel, rendering Positivus an unofficial yearly meeting of the two neighbour countries. Estonians call it "Estonia's biggest music festival in Latvia".

Landscape
Positivus is held in the Latvian coastal town of Salacgrīva; it's located between the A1 Via Baltica highway and the beach of the Riga Bay. The festival offers access to meadows, forests, the beach, as well as the local town of Salacgrīva.

Camping

The festival camping site is located on the other side of the A1 Via Baltica road, directly across from the festival venue and it is sponsored by Merrild coffee, which provides complementary coffee refills for campers during the entire festival. The camping grounds also has catering services. The car parking is located within a short distance from the camping site. As of 2016 there has been a separated area for caravans and trailer houses.

Positivus Festival 2020
The festival was canceled due to the COVID-19 pandemic.

Positivus Festival 2019
The festival took place on July 26–27, 2019.

Line-up

Positivus Festival 2018
The festival took place on July 20–22, 2018.

Line-up

Positivus Festival 2017
The festival took place on July 14–16, 2017.

Line-up

Positivus festival 2016
The festival took place on July 15–17, 2016.

Line-up

Positivus festival 2015
The event took place on July 17–19, 2015.

Line-up

Positivus festival 2014
The event took place on July 18–20, 2014.

Line-up

Positivus festival 2013
In 2013 for the first time ever the festival lasted for three days, taking place on July 19–21, 2013.

Line-up

Positivus festival 2012
The event took place on 20 and 21 July 2012.

Line-up

Positivus festival 2011
The event took place on 15 and 16 July 2011.

Line-up

Positivus festival 2010
The festival was held on 16 and 17 July 2010.

Line-up

Positivus festival 2009
The festival was held on 17 and 18 July 2009.

Line-up

PositivusAB 2008
The festival was held from 18 to 19 July 2008. It was attended by approximately 18,000 people.

Stages
AB Stage – where all 4 headliners as well as others performed
TELE2 Stage – where the majority of the bands performed
Shark dance tent – was open during the night
Mamma Daba Kušš Tuss tent – a minor stage featuring musical, literary and theatrical performances

Line-up

Line-up

PositivusAB 2007
It was the first PositivusAB festival. The festival was held from 27 to 28 July 2007.

Line-up

External links
Official homepage

References

Rock festivals in Latvia
Electronic music festivals in Latvia
Music festivals in Latvia
2007 establishments in Latvia
Summer events in Latvia